The Willoughby Almshouses were erected in 1685 in Cossall, Nottinghamshire, England.

These were originally for "4 single poor men over 60 years of age and 4 single poor women over 55 years of age".

There was an endowment of a farm at Roston and local land rents to give the residents a pension of £10 per year and a new grey cloth gown worth 3d per yard every 2 years, and 5 shillings worth of coal yearly.

The charity which supports the almshouses, Charity 214252, is still administered by Lord Middleton, the descendants of George Willoughby.

References

Almshouses in Nottinghamshire
Grade II* listed buildings in Nottinghamshire
Buildings and structures in Nottinghamshire
Buildings and structures completed in 1685
Grade II* listed almshouses
1685 establishments in England